Pseudocampylium is a genus of mosses belonging to the family Amblystegiaceae.

The species of this genus are found in Europe and Northern America.

Species:
 Pseudocampylium radicale (P.Beauv.) Vanderp. & Hedenäs

References

Amblystegiaceae
Moss genera